The Providence Monthly is a news and lifestyle magazine covering Providence, Rhode Island, and nearby parts of southeastern Massachusetts.

History and profile
The magazine was launched in 2000. The publisher is Providence Monthly LL.C. The magazine published its 100th issue in 2005. It is freely distributed in the metro Providence market. From June 2020 Providence Monthly merged with its sister magazine East Side Monthly under its title.

References

2000 establishments in Rhode Island
Free magazines
Lifestyle magazines published in the United States
Local interest magazines published in the United States
Magazines established in 2000
Magazines published in Rhode Island
Mass media in Providence, Rhode Island
Monthly magazines published in the United States
News magazines published in the United States